Abigail Adams (née Smith; November 22, [O.S. November 11] 1744 – October 28, 1818) was the wife and closest advisor of John Adams, as well as the mother of John Quincy Adams. She was a founder of the United States, and was the first second lady of the United States and second first lady of the United States, although such titles were not used at the time. She and Barbara Bush are the only two women to have been married to U.S. presidents and to have been the mothers of other U.S. presidents.

Adams's life is one of the most documented of the first ladies: she is remembered for the many letters she wrote to her husband John Adams while he stayed in Philadelphia, Pennsylvania, during the Continental Congresses. John frequently sought the advice of Abigail on many matters, and their letters are filled with intellectual discussions on government and politics. Her letters also serve as eyewitness accounts of the American Revolutionary War home front.

Surveys of historians conducted periodically by the Siena College Research Institute since 1982 have consistently found Adams to rank among the three most highly regarded first ladies by the assessments of historians.

Early life and family

Abigail Adams was born on November 22, 1744, at the North Parish Congregational Church in Weymouth, Massachusetts, to William Smith (1707–1783) and Elizabeth (née Quincy) Smith. On her mother's side, she was descended from the Quincy family, a well-known political family in the Massachusetts colony. Through her mother she was a cousin of Dorothy Quincy, who was married to John Hancock. Adams was also the great-granddaughter of John Norton, founding pastor of Old Ship Church in Hingham, Massachusetts, the only remaining 17th-century Puritan meetinghouse in Massachusetts. Smith married Elizabeth Quincy in 1740, and together they had three daughters; Abigail was the youngest, following her sisters Mary (1739–1811) and Elizabeth ("Betsy", 1742–1816). As with several of her ancestors, Adams's father was a liberal Congregational minister: a leader in a Yankee society that held its clergy in high esteem. Smith did not focus his preaching on predestination or original sin; instead he emphasized the importance of reason and morality. In July 1775 his wife Elizabeth, with whom he had been married for 35 years, died of smallpox. In 1784, at age 77, Smith died.

The Smith family were slaveholders and are known to have enslaved at least four people. An enslaved woman named Phoebe took a caretaking role to Abigail and other children; later on she would work as a paid servant for Abigail after she became free. Abigail would come to express anti-slavery beliefs as an adult. 

Abigail did not receive formal schooling; she was frequently sick as a child, something which may have been a factor preventing her from receiving an education. Later in life, Adams would also consider that she was deprived an education because females were rarely given such an opportunity. Although she did not receive a formal education, her mother taught her and her sisters to read, write and cipher; her father's, uncle's and grandfather's large libraries enabled the sisters to study English and French literature. Her grandmother, Elizabeth Quincy, also contributed to Adams's education. As she grew up, Adams read with friends in an effort to further her learning. She became one of the most erudite women ever to serve as first lady.

Marriage and children

Abigail Smith first met John Adams when she was 15 years old in 1759. John accompanied his friend Richard Cranch to the Smith household. Cranch was engaged to Abigail's older sister, Mary Smith, and they would be the parents of federal judge William Cranch. Adams reported finding the Smith sisters neither "fond, nor frank, nor candid".

Although Adams's father approved of the match, her mother was appalled that her daughter would marry a country lawyer whose manner still reeked of the farm, but eventually she gave in. The couple married on October 25, 1764, in the Smiths' home in Weymouth. Smith, Abigail's father, presided over the marriage of John Adams and his daughter. After the reception, the couple mounted a single horse and rode off to their new home, the saltbox house and farm John had inherited from his father in Braintree, Massachusetts (a location that is now part of Quincy). Later they moved to a second home in Boston, where his law practice expanded. The couple welcomed their first child nine months into their marriage.

In 12 years, she gave birth to six children:
 Abigail ("Nabby"; 1765–1813)
 John Quincy (1767–1848)
 Grace Susanna ("Susanna", nicknamed "Suky") (1768–1770)
 Charles (1770–1800)
 Thomas (1772–1832)
 Elizabeth (stillborn in 1777)

Her childrearing style included relentless and continual reminders of what the children owed to virtue and the Adams tradition. Adams was responsible for family and farm when her husband was on his long trips. "Alas!", she wrote in December 1773, "How many snow banks divide thee and me." Abigail and John's marriage is well documented through their correspondence and other writings. Letters exchanged throughout John's political obligations indicate his trust in Abigail's knowledge was sincere. Like her husband, Abigail often quoted literature in her letters. Historian David McCullough claims that she did so "more readily" than her husband. Their correspondence illuminated their mutual emotional and intellectual respect. John often excused himself to Abigail for his "vanity", exposing his need for her approval.

He moved the family to Boston in April 1768, renting a clapboard house on Brattle Street that was known locally as the "White House". He and Abigail and the children lived there for a year, then moved to Cold Lane; still later, they moved again to a larger house in Brattle Square in the center of the city.

John's growing law practice required changes for the family. In 1771, he moved Abigail and the children to Braintree, but he kept his office in Boston, hoping the time away from his family would allow him to focus on his work. Nevertheless, after some time in the capital, he became disenchanted with the rural and "vulgar" Braintree as a home for his family. In August 1772, therefore, Adams moved his family back to Boston. He purchased a large brick house on Queen Street, not far from his office. In 1774, Abigail and John returned the family to the farm due to the increasingly unstable situation in Boston, and Braintree remained their permanent Massachusetts home.

Abigail also took responsibility for the family's financial matters, including investments. Investments made through her uncle Cotton Tufts in debt instruments issued to finance the Revolutionary War were rewarded after Alexander Hamilton's First Report on the Public Credit endorsed full federal payment at face value to holders of government securities. One recent researcher even credits Abigail's financial acumen with providing for the Adams family's wealth through the end of John's lifetime.

Europe
In 1784, she and her daughter Nabby joined her husband and her eldest son, John Quincy, at her husband's diplomatic post in Paris. Abigail had dreaded the thought of the long sea voyage, but in fact found the journey interesting. At first she found life in Paris difficult, and was rather overwhelmed by the novel experience of running a large house with a retinue of servants. However, as the months passed she began to enjoy herself: she made numerous friends, discovered a fondness for the theatre and opera, and was fascinated by Parisian women's fashions, although she ruefully admitted that she "would never be in the mode".

After 1785, she filled the role of wife of the first U.S. minister to the Court of St James's (Britain). In contrast to Paris, Abigail disliked London, where she had few friends and was, in general, cold-shouldered by polite society. One pleasant experience was her temporary guardianship of Thomas Jefferson's young daughter Mary (Polly), for whom Abigail came to feel a deep and lifelong love.

She and John returned in 1788 to their home in Quincy, Peacefield (also known as the "Old House"), which she set about vigorously enlarging and remodeling. It still stands and is open to the public as part of Adams National Historical Park.

First Lady

John Adams was inaugurated as the second president of the United States on March 4, 1797, in Philadelphia. Abigail was not present at her husband's inauguration as she was tending to his dying 89-year-old mother. When John was elected President of the United States, Abigail continued a formal pattern of entertaining. She held a large dinner each week, made frequent public appearances, and provided for entertainment for the city of Philadelphia each Fourth of July.

She took an active role in politics and policy, unlike the quiet presence of Martha Washington. She was so politically active, her political opponents came to refer to her as "Mrs. President". As John's confidant, Abigail was often well informed on issues facing her husband's administration, at times including details of current events not yet known to the public in letters to her sister Mary and her son John Quincy. Some people used Abigail to contact the president. At times Abigail planted favorable stories about her husband in the press. Abigail remained a staunch supporter of her husband's political career, supporting his policies, such as passing the Alien and Sedition Acts.

Adams brought the children of her brother William Smith, her brother-in-law John Shaw, and her son Charles to live in the President's House during her husband's presidency because the children's respective fathers all struggled with alcoholism. Charles's daughter, Suzannah, was just 3 years old in 1800 when Adams brought her to live in the President's House in Philadelphia days before Charles's death.

With the relocation of the capital to Washington, D.C. in 1800, she became the first First Lady to reside at the White House, or President's House as it was then known. Adams moved into the White House in November 1800, living there for only the last four months of her husband's term. The city was wilderness, the President's House far from completion. She found the unfinished mansion in Washington "habitable" and the location "beautiful"; but she complained that, despite the thick woods nearby, she could find no one willing to chop and haul firewood for the First Family. Abigail used the East Room of the White House to hang up the laundry. Adams's health, never robust, suffered in Washington.

Later life 

After John's defeat in his presidential re-election campaign, the family retired to Peacefield in Quincy in 1800. Abigail followed her son's political career earnestly, as her letters to her contemporaries show. In later years, she renewed correspondence with Thomas Jefferson, having reached out to him upon the death of his daughter Maria Jefferson Eppes (Polly), whom Abigail had cared for and come to love when Polly was a small child in London, even though Jefferson's political opposition to her husband had hurt her deeply. She continued to raise her granddaughter Susanna. She also raised her elder grandchildren, including George Washington Adams and a younger John Adams, while their father John Quincy Adams was minister to Russia. Adams's 48-year-old daughter, Nabby, died of breast cancer in 1813, after having endured three years of severe pain.

Death

Adams died in her home on October 28, 1818, of typhoid fever. She is buried beside her husband and near their son John Quincy and his wife Louisa in a crypt located in the United First Parish Church (also known as the "Church of the Presidents") in Quincy, Massachusetts. She was 73 years old, exactly two weeks shy of her 74th birthday. Her last words were, "Do not grieve, my friend, my dearest friend. I am ready to go. And John, it will not be long." Less than eight years later, on July 4, 1826, the fiftieth anniversary of the Declaration of Independence, her husband died of heart failure at the age of 90. He was buried with his late wife and is not far from the grave of their son, John Quincy.

Political viewpoints

Biographer Lynne Withey argues for her conservatism because she: "feared revolution; she valued stability, believed that family and religion were the essential props of social order, and considered inequality a social necessity". Her 18th-century mindset held that "improved legal and social status for women was not inconsistent with their essentially domestic role."

Women's rights
Abigail Adams wrote about the troubles and concerns she had as an 18th-century woman. She was an advocate of married women's property rights and more opportunities for women, particularly in the field of education. Women, she believed, should not submit to laws not made in their interest, nor should they be content with the simple role of being companions to their husbands. They should educate themselves and thus be recognized for their intellectual capabilities so they could guide and influence the lives of their children and husbands. She is known for her March 1776 letter to John and the Continental Congress, requesting that they, "remember the ladies, and be more generous and favorable to them than your ancestors. Do not put such unlimited power into the hands of the Husbands. Remember all Men would be tyrants if they could. If particular care and attention is not paid to the Ladies we are determined to foment a Rebellion, and will not hold ourselves bound by any Laws in which we have no voice, or Representation."

John declined Abigail's "extraordinary code of laws", but acknowledged to Abigail, "We have only the name of masters, and rather than give up this, which would completely subject us to the despotism of the petticoat, I hope General Washington and all our brave heroes would fight."

Slavery and race
Adams opposed the existence of slavery in the United States and saw it a threat to American democracy. In a letter she wrote on March 31, 1776, Adams doubted that the majority of white people in Virginia had such "passion for Liberty" as they claimed they did, since they "deprive[d] their fellow Creatures" of freedom.

A notable incident regarding Adams' views on race happened in Philadelphia in 1791, when a free black youth came to her house asking to be taught how to read and write. Adams subsequently placed the boy in a local evening school, though not without objections from a neighbor. Adams responded that he was "a Freeman as much as any of the young Men and merely because his Face is Black, is he to be denied instruction? How is he to be qualified to procure a livelihood? ... I have not thought it any disgrace to my self to take him into my parlor and teach him both to read and write."

Despite her abolitionist views, Adams still maintained white supremacist viewpoints during her life. After attending a 1785 production of Othello in London, Adams wrote of her "disgust and horror" at seeing the play's titular protagonist, a black man, touching a white woman. Historian Annette Gordon-Reed stated that her views were in line with a "typical white person of the 18th century."

Religious beliefs
Adams was an active member of First Parish Church in Quincy, which became Unitarian in doctrine by 1753. Her theological views evolved over the course of her life. In a letter to her son near the end of her life, dated May 5, 1816, she wrote of her religious beliefs:

She also asked Louisa Adams in a letter dated January 3, 1818, "When will Mankind be convinced that true Religion is from the Heart, between Man and his creator, and not the imposition of Man or creeds and tests?"

Legacy
Historian Joseph Ellis has found that the 1,200 letters between John and Abigail "constituted a treasure trove of unexpected intimacy and candor, more revealing than any other correspondence between a prominent American husband and wife in American history." Ellis (2011) says that Abigail, although self-educated, was a better and more colorful letter-writer than John, even though John was one of the best letter-writers of the age. Ellis argues that Abigail was the more resilient and more emotionally balanced of the two, and calls her one of the most extraordinary women in American history.

Memorials

The Abigail Adams Cairn – a mound of rough stones – crowns the nearby Penn Hill from which she and her son, John Quincy Adams, watched the Battle of Bunker Hill and the burning of Charlestown. At that time she was minding the children of Dr. Joseph Warren, president of the Massachusetts Provincial Congress, who was killed in the battle.

One of the subpeaks of New Hampshire's Mount Adams (whose main peak is named for her husband) is named in her honor.

In 2022, a seven-foot tall bronze statue of Adams was unveiled in Quincy, Massachusetts, on the Hancock Adams Common.

An Adams Memorial has been proposed in Washington, D.C., honoring Adams, her husband, her son, and other members of their family.

Popular culture
Passages from Adams's letters to her husband figured prominently in songs from the Broadway musical 1776. Virginia Vestoff played Adams in the original 1969 Broadway production of 1776 and recreated the role for the film version in 1972. On television, Kathryn Walker and Leora Dana portrayed Adams in the 1976 PBS mini-series The Adams Chronicles. In the mini-series John Adams, which premiered in March 2008 on HBO, she was played by Laura Linney. Linney enjoyed portraying Adams, saying that "she is a woman of both passion and principle." A revolution-era Abigail, circa 1781, is portrayed by Michelle Trachtenberg, on the television series, Sleepy Hollow, in the season 2 episode, "Pittura Infamante" (January 19, 2015), her assistance being crucial in ending a series of unexplained murders from the period. Adams is a featured figure on Judy Chicago's installation piece The Dinner Party, being represented as one of the 999 names on the Heritage Floor. Novelist Barbara Hambly, writing as Barbara Hamilton, wrote three historical mysteries set in the early 1770s told from Abigail Adams' perspective (and featuring Abigail as the detective): The Ninth Daughter (2009), A Marked Man (2010), and Sup with the Devil (2011).

Portrait on currency
The First Spouse Program under the Presidential $1 Coin Program authorizes the United States Mint to issue half-ounce $10 gold coins and bronze medal duplicates to honor the first spouses of the United States. The Abigail Adams coin was released on June 19, 2007, and sold out in just hours. She is pictured on the back of the coin writing her most famous letter to John Adams. In February 2009 Coin World reported that some 2007 Abigail Adams medals were struck using the reverse from the 2008 Louisa Adams medal, apparently by mistake. These pieces, called mules, were contained within the 2007 First Spouse medal set. The U.S. Mint has not released an estimate of how many mules were made.

Regard by historians
Since 1982 Siena College Research Institute has periodically conducted surveys asking historians to assess American first ladies according to a cumulative score on the independent criteria of their background, value to the country, intelligence, courage, accomplishments, integrity, leadership, being their own women, public image, and value to the president. Consistently, Adams has ranked among the three-most highly regarded first ladies in these surveys. In terms of cumulative assessment, Adams has been ranked:
2nd-best of 42 in 1982
3rd-best of 37 in 1993
2nd-best of 38 in 2003
2nd-best of 38 in 2008
2nd-best of 39 in 2014

In the 2008 Siena Research Institute survey, Adams was ranked in the top-four of all criteria, ranking the 3rd-highest in of background, 2nd-highest in intelligence, 3rd-highest in value to the country, 3rd-highest in being her "own woman", 2nd-highest in integrity, 3rd-highest in her accomplishments, 3rd-highest in courage, 2nd-highest in leadership, 4th-highest in public image, and 2nd-highest in her value to the president. In the 2014 survey, Adams and her husband were ranked the 5th-highest out of 39 first couples in terms of being a "power couple".

Family tree

References

Bibliography

Secondary sources
 Abrams, Jeanne E. First Ladies of the Republic: Martha Washington, Abigail Adams, Dolley Madison, and the Creation of an Iconic American Role (NYU Press, 2018).
 Barker-Benfield, G.J. Abigail and John Adams: The Americanization of Sensibility (University of Chicago Press; 2010).
 Bober, Natalie S. 1995. Abigail Adams: Witness to a Revolution New York: Simon & Schuster Children's Publishing Division.
 Ellis, Joseph J. First Family: Abigail and John Adams (New York: Alfred A. Knopf, 2010).
 Gelles, Edith B. Portia: The World of Abigail Adams (Bloomington: Indiana University Press, 1991).
 ——. First Thoughts: Life and Letters of Abigail Adams (New York: Twayne Publishers, 1998), reissued as Abigail Adams: A Writing Life (London and New York: Routledge, 2002).
 ——. "The Adamses Retire". Early American Studies 4.1 (2006): 1–15.
 ——. Abigail and John: Portrait of a Marriage (New York: William Morrow, 2009) – finalist for the 2010 George Washington Book Prize.
 ——. "Bonds of Friendship: The Correspondence of Abigail Adams and Mercy Otis Warren". Proceedings of the Massachusetts Historical Society (1996), Vol. 108, p35-71. 
 Holton, Woody. Abigail Adams: A Life (New York: Free Press, 2009) – winner of the 2010 Bancroft Prize.
 Jacobs, Diane. Dear Abigail: The Intimate Lives and Revolutionary Ideas of Abigail Adams and Her Two Remarkable Sisters. (2014)
 Kaminski, John P., editor The Quotable Abigail Adams (Cambridge, MA: Belknap Press of Harvard University Press, 2009).
 Levin, Phyllis Lee. Abigail Adams: A Biography (St. Martin's Press. 1987). 575pp
 
 Nagel, Paul C. 1987. The Adams Women: Abigail and Louisa Adams, Their Sisters and Daughters. New York: {Oxford University Press}. 
 Orihel, Michelle. "Remember The Ladies: Teaching the Correspondence of John and Abigail Adams in the Age of Social Media". Common-Place: The Interactive Journal of Early American Life (2018) 18#1 p 3+
 Sawyer, Kem Knapp.  Abigail Adams (2009) for secondary schools.
 Shields, David S., and Fredrika J. Teute. "The Court of Abigail Adams". Journal of the Early Republic 35.2 (2015): 227–235.
 Abigail Adams: Eyewitness to America's Birth (2009), for middle schools. Time magazine.
 Waldstreicher, David, ed. A Companion to John Adams and John Quincy Adams (2013).
 Winner, Viola Hopkins. "Abigail Adams and 'The Rage of Fashion. Dress (Costume Society of America). 2001, Vol. 28, pp. 64-76.

Historiography
 Crane, Elaine Forman. "Abigail Adams and Feminism". in David Waldstreicher, ed. A Companion to John Adams and John Quincy Adams (2013) pp 199-
 Hogan, Margaret A. "Abigail Adams: The Life and the biographers". in David Waldstreicher, ed. A Companion to John Adams and John Quincy Adams (2013) pp 218–38.
 Wood, Gordon S. (May 12, 2011).  "Those Sentimental Americans". New York Review of Books.

Primary sources
 Adams, Abigail. Abigail Adams: Letters (Library of America, 2016).
 Adams, Johns, and Abigail Adams. My Dearest Friend: Letters of Abigail and John Adams (2007); 556 pp
 Belton, Blair, ed. Abigail Adams in Her Own Words (2014)
 The Letters of John and Abigail Adams ed by Frank Shuffelton (2003).

External links

 Founders Online, searchable edition
 Adams Papers Editorial Project
 
 
 
 Adams family biographies – Massachusetts Historical Society
 Collection of Abigail Adams Letters
 The Adams Women: Abigail and Louisa Adams, Their Sisters and Daughters, Harvard University Press
 Descent from Glory: Four Generations of the John Adams Family, Harvard University Press
 Adams Family Correspondence. Cambridge: Harvard University Press
 Abigail Adams Birthplace – Museum in Weymouth, Massachusetts
 Ancestors of Abigail Smith
 Abigail Adams at C-SPAN's First Ladies: Influence & Image
 Michals, Debra. "Abigail Adams". National Women's History Museum. 2015.

|-

1744 births
1818 deaths
18th-century American women writers
18th-century American writers
18th-century Unitarians
18th-century letter writers
19th-century American women
19th-century Unitarians
Adams political family
American Congregationalists
American Unitarians
American feminists
American letter writers
American people of English descent
Burials in Massachusetts
Colonial American women
Deaths from typhoid fever
First ladies of the United States
Infectious disease deaths in Massachusetts
Mothers of presidents of the United States
People from Braintree, Massachusetts
People from Weymouth, Massachusetts
People of Massachusetts in the American Revolution
People of colonial Massachusetts
Quincy family
Second ladies of the United States
Women in the American Revolution
Women letter writers